Daniel González may refer to:

 Daniel Alberto González (born 1991), Argentine football midfielder
 Daniel Gonzalez (Argentine footballer), Argentine football goalkeeper
 Daniel Gonzalez (soccer) (born 1992), Mexican-American soccer player
 Daniel Gonzalez (spree killer) (1980–2007), British spree killer
 Daniel González (Uruguayan footballer) (1953–1985), Uruguayan football defender
 Daniel González Benítez (born 1987), Spanish footballer
 Daniel González Calvo (born 1984), Chilean football midfielder
 Daniel González Orellana (born 2002), Chilean football defender
 Daniel González Vega (born 1992), Mexican footballer
 Danny Gonzalez (born 1994), American YouTuber